U was an interactive youth-oriented New Zealand television channel, owned and operated by TVNZ. The channel launched on 13 March 2011, and featured reality programming, as well as an interactive live show and music content. It replaced the now defunct TVNZ 6. Leading up to the launch of U, there were 13 days' worth of promotional videos and programming information aired to advertise the new channel.

Initially, U closed down every night at midnight, playing the Goodnight Kiwi animation to signal the end of nightly broadcast. During its closedown period of 12-midnight to 12-noon, the channel looped a video of non-stop dancing with text reading U 'returns at midday'.

From February 2012, the channel began broadcasting infomercials from midnight until midday, except on Saturday and Sunday mornings, when it is illegal to broadcast adverts. On Saturday and Sunday, the channel closes down as usual, with infomercials played until 6am, a graphic is displayed from 6am until midday, and then the broadcast 'returns at midday'.

In April 2013, the channel launched U Late, a late night version of its flagship programme U Live, but without the music videos. It was described as late night antics and chat, live and interactive every evening.

On 29 July 2013, TVNZ announced that U would cease broadcast on 31 August 2013, after two years since the channel launch.

Pre-launch
In preparation of the launch of U, TVNZ established a Facebook page for their new channel, giving fans information and offering one person the chance to schedule a selected segment of programming on the new channel for a month (known as U TV). On the evening of 28 February 2011, TVNZ 6 was officially shut down, allowing TVNZ to air promotional material for the new channel. At 3 pm on 9 March 2011, TVNZ activated its U Live application on Facebook, which, upon the launch of the channel, would allow users to share content and have it displayed as part of the U Live TV show.

Launch
U was launched on 13 March 2011 at 4 pm on Freeview channel 6 and Sky channel 16. The first program to air was U Live.

Closure
TVNZ  closed U on 31 August 2013 at 7 pm after two years running at a loss. TVNZ announced that time-shift channel TV2+1 would launch to replace the channel on 1 September 2013 at 7 am. The final show to screen on U was U Live with the entire crew giving a farewell message, the final song to play on U Live was 2 Times by Ann Lee. After the end credits for U Live, a message was displayed on the U channel advising viewers of the new channel number for TV One +1 and TV2+1 (now TVNZ 1 +1 and TVNZ 2 +1 respectively). The channel numbers vary for viewers of Sky, Freeview and Igloo.

U Live

The flagship show of U was U Live, a live show which aired 4pm – 7pm daily. The show featured music, interviews, and other general interest content. Viewers were invited to participate via a Facebook application, where they could vote in polls, take part in discussions, and view the show via a live commercial and graphic free stream. Comments and polls were then selected and displayed on screen during broadcast. U Live was hosted by Rose Matafeo, Connor Nestor, Matt Gibb, Eli Matthewson and former George FM breakfast host Kirsteen MacKenzie. U Live drew many parallels to TVNZ's rival network MediaWorks' youth-oriented show Four Live, which aired on FOUR.

U's themed nights
U had themed programming for the different days of the week, with each theme having a distinctive title. Selected programming available on each night is listed below.

 Programming until closure

References

Defunct television channels in New Zealand
Television channels and stations established in 2011
Television channels and stations disestablished in 2013
English-language television stations in New Zealand